Mesa de los Tres Reyes (Basque: Hiru Erregeen Mahaia, Roncalese Basque: Iror Errege Maia, Aragonese: Meseta d'os Tres Reis, Gascon: Tabla d'eths Tros Rouyes,  French: Table des Trois Rois) is a mountain of the Pyrenees.

Its name, "The Table of the Three Kings", derives from the fact that the mountain is located at the confluence of the ancient kingdoms of Navarre, Aragon, and Béarn; where the three kings of those kingdoms met from time to time to discuss matters of importance.

See also
 Pyrenees
Tossal dels Tres Reis

External links
 "Mesa de los Tres Reyes" on Summitpost
  Mesa de los Tres Reyes, CamptoCamp.

Mountains of the Pyrenees
Mountains of Aragon
Mountains of Navarre